The Cassandra Cat, also released under the titles When the Cat Comes, The Cat Who Wore Sunglasses, One Day a Cat and/or That Cat, is a 1963 Czechoslovak film directed by Vojtěch Jasný.

The film won two major awards at the Cannes Film Festival in 1963, including the C.S.T. Prize and Special Jury Prize, Cannes. After a digital restoration, the film was shown in the Cannes Classics section at the 2021 Cannes Film Festival and digital versions of were released in cinemas throughout the Czech Republic.

Plot
Robert is a school teacher in an undisclosed Bohemian village. He is under stress from Charlie, the foreboding town mayor who controls the happenings in town, and from his unfaithful and uncaring lover. Robert is forced to teach his students a ‘black and white’ view on life and a realist view on art, stifling imagination.

For an ‘artistic’ painting class, Oliva, a castellan (and storyteller) is invited as the subject. Instead of posing as a model, Oliva recounts a story of a cat with sunglasses – whose eyes revealed the true nature of the human condition through colour. Red, importantly, was the colour of ‘lovers’ – well-meaning people, whilst colours like yellow and purple were reserved for the unfaithful, envious and unruly. The ‘normal’ people eventually killed the cat, for they didn't want others to know who was good or bad.

In the midst of a circus act coming to town, Robert's cat goes missing and he is led to Diana – an actress who is part of the performance. He meets the magician who bears a striking resemblance to Oliva and talks to Robert about his ‘nature’ – joshing Robert about his choice of ‘normal’ clothes.

During the performance to the entire town, Oliva's tales of the cat come to fruition when the cat is revealed to everyone watching – and Diana takes off its sunglasses. The moment of everyone's colours being revealed drives the entire town insane, fighting over themselves. Robert, who's true nature is red, finds himself entranced with Diana – and the two embark on a romantic, idyllic outing.

Whilst the cat is later found by children in the woods, the school servant snatches it and attempts for it to be killed – orchestrated by Charlie. Robert is tasked to teach children about a taxidermized stork in front of Charlie, but moved by the cat's power, gives a moving passage to the children that they shouldn't have to study the dead animal. This angers Charlie and the superiors in the town, who attempt to frame Robert for killing the cat.

At one point, the children go missing along with Robert, demanding they'll come back if the cat's safety is ensured. This sends the town amok, with families squabbling in the woods to find their lost loved ones. But, the children are nowhere to be found – not even Robert can find them, who tells them to come back. Eventually, the servant returns the cat and the children come out from hiding. When the crowd debates what to do with the cat, Diana and the circus act reappear to expose Charlie's true colors – a ‘chameleon’ of personalities, who is chased out of the town, reigniting the initial chaos in the town. When Robert tries to chase after Diana to accompany her, he is accosted by the frenzied crowd and loses her as the act travels out of town. Defeated, Robert walks alone back into the town square, only to be greeted by the children, who are holding art and paintings of the cat.

Cast
 Jan Werich - Magician / Oliva
 Emília Vášáryová - Diana (as Emilie Vasáryová)
 Vlastimil Brodský - Teacher Robert
 Jiří Sovák - School director
 Vladimír Menšík - School janitor
 Jiřina Bohdalová - Julie
 Karel Effa - Janek
 Vlasta Chramostová - Marjánka
 Alena Kreuzmannová - Gossip
 Stella Zázvorková - Ruzena
 Jaroslav Mareš - Restaurant owner
 Jana Werichová - Chairman's wife
 Ladislav Fialka - Stealer
 Karel Vrtiska - Miller
 Václav Babka - Policeman

Production 
The film was made in the Czech town of Telč.

Restoration 
The Cassandra Cat was digitally restored by the Czech National Archive in cooperation with Laboratorio L'immagine Ritrovata and the Karlovy Vary International Film Festival from original 1963 copies found in archives in Hungary and Poland. Maintaining the film's original colour scheme proved to be a challenge due to its "multi-coloured experimental celluloid techniques".

Reception 
In a 1990 review for The New York Times, film critic Caryn James described the film as a "Czechoslovak allegory from 1963 meant to expose political hypocrisy". James praised the film's photography but found fault with Jasný "overdoing every effect", concluding that The Cassandra Cat "fell short of the believable fantasy it needs to live on as more than a curiosity".

Jonathan Rosenbaum referred to the film as a "genuine oddity from 1963 Czechoslovakia" and described it as "whimsical, likable, and inventive" and likened it to a cross between the Pied Piper and Bye Bye Birdie. He concluded that the film qualifies as "one of the best early examples of the Czech New Wave".

References

External links

1963 films
1964 romantic comedy films
1964 films
1960s romantic fantasy films
1960s fantasy comedy films
Czechoslovak fantasy films
1960s Czech-language films
Films about cats
Films directed by Vojtěch Jasný
Circus films
Czech fantasy comedy films
Czech romantic comedy films
Films with screenplays by Jiří Brdečka
1963 comedy films
Films based on fairy tales